Thiophosgene is a red liquid with the formula . It is a molecule with trigonal planar geometry. There are two reactive C–Cl bonds that allow it to be used in diverse organic syntheses.

Preparation
 is prepared in a two-step process from carbon disulfide. In the first step, carbon disulfide is chlorinated to give trichloromethanesulfenyl chloride (perchloromethyl mercaptan), :

The chlorination must be controlled as excess chlorine converts trichloromethanesulfenyl chloride into carbon tetrachloride. Steam distillation separates the trichloromethanesulfenyl chloride, a rare sulfenyl chloride, and hydrolyzes the disulfur dichloride. Reduction of trichloromethanesulfenyl chloride produces thiophosgene:

Tin and dihydroanthracene have been used for the reducing agents.

Reactions
 is mainly used to prepare compounds with the connectivity  where X = OR, NHR. Such reactions proceed via intermediate such as CSClX. Under certain conditions, one can convert primary amines into isothiocyanates.
 also serves as a dienophile to give, after reduction 5-thiacyclohexene derivatives. Thiophosgene is also known as the appropriate reagent in Corey-Winter synthesis for stereospecific conversion of 1,2-diols into alkenes.

It forms a head-to-tail dimer upon irradiation with UV light:

Unlike thiophosgene monomer, a red liquid, the photodimer, an example of a 1,3-dithietane, is a colourless solid.

Safety considerations
 is considered highly toxic.

References

Further reading

Inorganic carbon compounds
Inorganic sulfur compounds
Thiochlorides
Thiocarbonyl compounds
Lachrymatory agents